The 1994 Sacred Heart Pioneers football team represented Sacred Heart University as an independent during the 1994 NCAA Division II football season. Led by third-year head coach Gary Reho the Pioneers compiled a record of 4–5. Sacred Heart played home games at Campus Field in Fairfield, Connecticut.

Schedule

References

Sacred Heart
Sacred Heart Pioneers football seasons
Sacred Heart Pioneers football